John Rodgers may refer to:

Military
 John Rodgers (1728–1791), colonel during the Revolutionary War and owner of Rodgers Tavern, Perryville, Maryland
 John Rodgers (naval officer, born 1772), U.S. naval officer during the War of 1812, first naval John Rodgers
 John Rodgers (admiral) (1812–1882), naval officer during the Civil War, son of the above
 John Rodgers (naval officer, born 1881) (1881–1926), naval officer during World War I and aviation pioneer, great-grandson of the first naval John Rodgers
 Six ships, three USS John Rodgers and three USS Rodgers, were named for the above officers

Music
 John Rodgers (musician) (born 1962), Australian composer and musician
 Johnny Rodgers (singer) (born 1974), American singer-songwriter

Politics
 Sir John Rodgers, 1st Baronet (1906–1993), British Conservative MP for Sevenoaks
 John M. Rodgers (1928–2012), Pennsylvania politician
 John S. Rodgers (born 1965), American politician in Vermont

Other
 John Kearney Rodgers (1793–1851), American surgeon
 John Rodgers (boxer) (born 1947), Irish boxer
 John Rodgers (geologist) (1914–2004), American geologist
 John Rodgers (New Zealand bishop) (1915–1997), missionary bishop
 John Rodgers (theologian) (1930–2022), American Anglican theologian and bishop
 Johnny Rodgers (born 1951), American football player

See also
John Rogers (disambiguation)